Alister Edgar McGrath  (born 1953) is a Northern Irish theologian, Anglican priest, intellectual historian, scientist, Christian apologist, and public intellectual. He currently holds the Andreas Idreos Professorship in Science and Religion in the Faculty of Theology and Religion, and is a fellow of Harris Manchester College at the University of Oxford, and is Professor of Divinity at Gresham College. He was previously Professor of Theology, Ministry, and Education at King's College London and Head of the Centre for Theology, Religion and Culture, Professor of Historical Theology at the University of Oxford, and was principal of Wycliffe Hall, Oxford, until 2005.

Aside from being a faculty member at Oxford, McGrath has also taught at Cambridge University and is a Teaching Fellow at Regent College. McGrath holds three doctorates from the University of Oxford: a doctoral degree in molecular biophysics, a Doctor of Divinity degree in theology, and a Doctor of Letters degree in intellectual history.

McGrath is noted for his work in historical theology, systematic theology, and the relationship between science and religion, as well as his writings on apologetics. He is also known for his opposition to New Atheism and antireligion and his advocacy of theological critical realism. Among his best-known books are The Twilight of Atheism, The Dawkins Delusion?, Dawkins' God: Genes, Memes, and the Meaning of Life, and A Scientific Theology. He is also the author of a number of popular textbooks on theology.

Biography 
McGrath was born on 23 January 1953 in Belfast, Northern Ireland, and grew up in Downpatrick, County Down, where he attended Down High School. In September 1966 he became a pupil at the Methodist College Belfast, where his studies focused on mathematics, physics and chemistry. He went up to Wadham College, Oxford, in 1971 and gained first-class honours in chemistry in 1975.  He began research in molecular biophysics in the Oxford University Department of Biochemistry under the supervision of George Radda and was elected to an E.P.A. Cephalosporin Research Studentship at Linacre College, Oxford, for the academic year 1975–1976, and to a Domus Senior Scholarship at Merton College, Oxford, for the period 1976–1978. During these three years, he carried out scientific research while studying for the Oxford University Final Honour School of Theology. He was awarded an Oxford Doctor of Philosophy degree for his research in molecular biophysics (December 1977), and gained first-class honours in theology in June 1978.

Reflecting on his time as an undergraduate at Wadham, McGrath has written, "I was discovering that Christianity was far more intellectually robust than I had ever imagined. I had some major rethinking to do, and by the end of November [1971], my decision was made: I turned my back on one faith and embraced another."

McGrath then left Oxford to work at the University of Cambridge, where he also studied for ordination in the Church of England. In September 1980, he was ordained deacon and began ministry as a curate at St Leonard's Parish Church, Wollaton, Nottingham, in the English East Midlands. He was ordained priest at Southwell Minster in September 1981. In 1983, he was appointed lecturer in Christian doctrine and ethics at Wycliffe Hall, Oxford, and a member of the Oxford University Faculty of Theology. He was awarded a BD by Oxford in 1983, for research in historical theology. He spent the fall semester of 1990 as the Ezra Squire Tipple Visiting Professor of Historical Theology at the Divinity School of Drew University, Madison, New Jersey.

McGrath was elected University Research Lecturer in Theology at Oxford University in 1993 and also served as research professor of theology at Regent College, Vancouver, from 1993 to 1999. In 1995, he was elected Principal of Wycliffe Hall and in 1999, was awarded a personal chair in theology by the University of Oxford with the title "Professor of Historical Theology". He was awarded the Oxford degree of DD in 2001 for his research in historical and systematic theology, and was a founding member of the International Society for Science and Religion. On 1 September 2008 McGrath took up the Chair of Theology, Ministry and Education in the Department of Education and Professional Studies at King's College London.  In 2010 McGrath was included in "The 20 Most Brilliant Christian Professors" list. In 2013 he was awarded his third doctorate from Oxford University, a DLitt, Division of Humanities, for research into science and religion, and natural theology.  He is married to Joanna Collicutt McGrath and they have two adult children.

In 2014, McGrath was appointed the 32nd Professor of Divinity at Gresham College, a position dating back to 1597. In this position he is to deliver a series of free public lectures on Science, Faith, and God: The Big Questions, in which he hopes to present "a coherent exploration of how Christian theology can engage with concerns and debates within modern culture, focussing on one of its leading elements – the natural sciences."

Views 
A former atheist, McGrath accepts and promotes evolution. In 2004 McGrath suggested in The Twilight of Atheism that atheism was in decline. He has been highly critical of Richard Dawkins, calling him "embarrassingly ignorant of Christian theology". His book, The Dawkins Delusion? – a response to Dawkins's The God Delusion – was published by SPCK in February 2007, and the two had public debate on the topic, "Does religious belief damage the health of a society, or is it necessary to provide the moral and ethical foundations of a healthy society?"

McGrath has also debated with Daniel Dennett, at the Greer-Heard Point-Counterpoint Forum in New Orleans in February 2007, as well as Christopher Hitchens at Georgetown University. In March 2007, McGrath debated with Peter Atkins at the University of Edinburgh on the topic 'Darwin and Humanity: Should We Rid the Mind of God?' In November that year, he debated with Susan Blackmore on the existence of God. McGrath has debated with David Helfand at the Veritas Forum on whether belief in God is a delusion. In 2011, he debated with Stephen Law on the topic 'Why Won't God Go Away?' He was interviewed by Richard Dawkins about his book Dawkins' God and faith in general for the television documentary The Root of All Evil? McGrath's interview was not included in the final cut, but the unedited footage is available online.

Writings
The author of more than 50 books, among McGrath's more notable works are:

 A Life of John Calvin (1993) 
 A Passion for Truth: The Intellectual Coherence of Evangelicalism (1996) 

 Science and Religion: An Introduction (1998) 
 Historical Theology: An Introduction to the History of Christian Thought (1998) 
 I Believe: Exploring the Apostles' Creed (1998) 
 T. F. Torrance: An Intellectual Biography (1999) 
 The Journey: A Pilgrim in the Lands of the Spirit (2000) 
 Christian Theology: An Introduction (2001)   (often used as a seminary textbook)
 The Christian Theology Reader (2001)   (containing primary sources referred to in his Christian Theology)
 In the Beginning : The Story of the King James Bible and How It Changed a Nation, a Language, and a Culture (2001) 
 Glimpsing the Face of God: The Search for Meaning in the Universe (2001) 
 The Reenchantment of Nature: The Denial of Religion and the Ecological Crisis (2002) 
 Knowing Christ (2002) 
 A Scientific Theology v. 3 (2003) 
 A Brief History of Heaven (2003) 
 The Intellectual Origins of the European Reformation (2003) 
 The Twilight of Atheism: The Rise and Fall of Disbelief in the Modern World (2004) 
 Christianity's Dangerous Idea: The Protestant Revolution from the Sixteenth to the Twenty-First Century (2007) 
 The Dawkins Delusion? Atheist Fundamentalism and the denial of the divine (2007)  (A critical response to Dawkins' book The God Delusion)
 The Open Secret: A New Vision for Natural Theology (2008) 
 A Fine-Tuned Universe: The Quest for God in Science and Theology (2009) 
 Heresy: A History of Defending the Truth (2009) 
 Mere Theology: Christian Faith and the Discipleship of the Mind (2010) 
 Chosen Ones (Series: The Aedyn Chronicles Volume: 1) (2010) 
 Surprised by Meaning: Science, Faith, and How We Make Sense of Things (2011) 
 Why God Won't Go Away: Engaging with the New Atheism (2011) 
 Flight of the Outcasts (Series: The Aedyn Chronicles Volume: 2) (2011) 
 Darkness Shall Fall (Series: The Aedyn Chronicles Volume: 3) (2011) 
 Reformation Thought: An Introduction (2012) 
 Darwinism and the Divine: Evolutionary Thought and Natural Theology (Oxford: Blackwell-Wiley, 2011). The 2009 Hulsean Lectures at the University of Cambridge
 The Intellectual World of C. S. Lewis (2013) 
 C. S. Lewis- A Life: Eccentric Genius, Reluctant Prophet (2013)
  Dawkins' God: Genes, Memes, and the Meaning of Life ([2004] 2015), 2nd ed., Wiley.   , pbk. (A critique of scientist Richard Dawkins' attitude towards religion)
 The Big Question: Why We Can’t Stop Talking About Science, Faith, and God (2015), St. Martin's Press, 
 Enriching Our Vision of Reality: Theology and Natural Sciences in Dialogue (2016), Templeton Press, 
 The Landscape of Faith: An Explorer's Guide to Christian Creeds (2018), SPCK, 
 Mere Discipleship: Growing in Wisdom and Hope (2018), Baker Books, 
 Narrative Apologetics: Sharing the Relevance, Joy, and Wonder of the Christian Faith (2019), Baker Books, 
 Richard Dawkins, C.S. Lewis and the Meaning of Life (2019), SPCK, 
 A Theory of Everything (That Matters): A Brief Guide to Einstein, Relativity, and His Surprising Thoughts on God (2019), Tyndale, 
 J.I. Packer: His Life and Thought (2020), InterVarsity Press,

References

Further reading 
 Chung, S. W. (ed.). Alister E. McGrath and Evangelical Theology: A Dynamic Engagement. Carlisle: Paternoster, 2003. 
 Keating, James F. "The Natural Sciences as an Ancilla Theologiae Nova: Alister E. McGrath's A Scientific Theology." The Thomist 69 (2005): 127–52.
 Myers, Benjamin. "Alister McGrath's Scientific Theology." Reformed Theological Review 64 (2005): 15–34.
 Shipway, Brad. "The Theological Application of Bhaskar's Stratified Reality: The Scientific Theology of A. E. McGrath." Journal of Critical Realism 3 (2004): 191–203.

External links 
 
Alister McGrath homepage
 Open Forum with Alister McGrath – 'Is God a Delusion? Atheism and the Meaning of Life'
 Alister McGrath on The Hour (CBC television)
Richard Dawkins Interviews Alister McGrath Video
Alister McGrath lecture: God and the Good: Einstein and Religion. Filmed at The University of Sheffield
Prokhorov Centre interview with McGrath
Alister McGrath talks to Nigel Bovey of The War Cry: Part 1; Part 2
Christopher Hitchens debates (with) Alister McGrath
Alister McGrath debates with Peter Atkins at Edinburgh University
Sue Blackmore at Bristol University on the motion that Alister McGrath debates  "belief in God is a dangerous delusion". 13 November 2007. 
Full texts of McGrath's 2009 Gifford Lectures on natural theology

 

1953 births
20th-century Anglican theologians
21st-century Anglican theologians
Academics of King's College London
Alumni of Linacre College, Oxford
Alumni of Merton College, Oxford
Alumni of Wadham College, Oxford
Anglican priests from Northern Ireland
Calvinist and Reformed ministers
Christian apologists
Converts to Anglicanism from atheism or agnosticism
Critics of atheism
Evangelical Anglican clergy
Evangelical Anglican theologians
Living people
People educated at Down High School
People educated at Methodist College Belfast
People from Downpatrick
Principals of Wycliffe Hall, Oxford
Professors of Gresham College
Systematic theologians
Theistic evolutionists
Writers about religion and science